Robert Hugh Benson AFSC KC*SG KGCHS (18 November 1871 – 19 October 1914) was an English Catholic priest and writer.  First an Anglican priest, he was received into the Catholic Church in 1903 and ordained therein the next year. He was also a prolific writer of fiction, writing the notable dystopian novel Lord of the World, as well as Come Rack! Come Rope!. 

His output encompassed historical, horror and science fiction, contemporary fiction, children's stories, plays, apologetics, devotional works and articles. He continued his writing career at the same time as he progressed through the hierarchy to become a Chamberlain to Pope Pius X in 1911, and gain the title of Monsignor before his death a few years later.

Early life 
Benson was the youngest son of Edward White Benson, the Archbishop of Canterbury and his wife, Mary; Benson was the younger brother of E. F. Benson, A. C. Benson and Margaret Benson.

Benson was educated at Eton College and then studied classics and theology at Trinity College, Cambridge, from 1890 to 1893.

In 1895, Benson was ordained a priest in the Church of England by his father, who was the then Archbishop of Canterbury.

Career

After his father died suddenly in 1896, Benson was sent on a trip to the Middle East to recover his own health. While there he began to question the status of the Church of England and to consider the claims of the Catholic Church. His own piety began to tend toward the High Church tradition, and he started exploring religious life in various Anglican communities, eventually obtaining permission to join the Community of the Resurrection.

Benson made his profession as a member of the community in 1901, at which time he had no thoughts of leaving the Church of England. As he continued his studies and began writing, however, he became more and more uneasy with his own doctrinal position and, on 11 September 1903, he was received into the Catholic Church. Benson was ordained as a Catholic priest in 1904. As the son of the late Archbishop of Canterbury, his conversion, and his subsequent ordination, caused a sensation.

His first assignment was as a college chaplain. He had a stutter and is said to have had a 'reedy' voice. Benson was a popular preacher, attracting large audiences wherever he spoke. In 1914, he visited the University of Notre Dame and gave an address on the papacy. Both Confessions of a Convert (1913) and Lourdes (1914) were serialized in Notre Dame's Ave Maria magazine, before appearing as books.

He was awarded the Dignitary of Honour of the Order of the Holy Sepulchre.

Novelist
Benson continued his writing career along with his ministry as a priest. Like both his brothers, Edward Frederic Benson ("Fred") and Arthur Christopher Benson, Robert wrote many ghost and horror stories, as well as children's stories and historical fiction. His horror and ghost fiction are collected in The Light Invisible (1903) and A Mirror of Shallott (1907). 

His novel, Lord of the World (1907), is generally regarded as one of the first modern dystopian novels. In the speculative 2007 he predicted there, the Anglican Church and other Protestant denominations have crumbled and disappeared under a rising tide of secularism and atheism, leaving an embattled Catholic Church as the sole champion of Christian truth. Nations are armed with weapons which can destroy a whole city from the air within minutes, and euthanasia is widely practiced and considered as a moral advance. The Antichrist is depicted as a charismatic secular liberal who organizes an international body devoted to world peace and love under his direction. 

In his next novel The Dawn of All (1911), Benson imagined an opposite future 1973 in which the Catholic Church has emerged victorious in England and worldwide after Germany and Austria won the "Emperor War" of 1914; this book is also notable in its fairly accurate prediction of a global network of a passenger air travel. Come Rack! Come Rope! (1912) is a historical novel describing the persecution of English Catholics during the Elizabethan era. The bibliography below reveals a prodigious output.

Among his historical novels is the Reformation Trilogy: By What Authority (1905), The King’s Achievement (1905), and The Queen’s Tragedy (1907).

Vatican chaplaincy
Benson was appointed a supernumerary private chamberlain to the Pope (Pius X) in 1911 and consequently styled as Monsignor.

Private life
As a young man, Benson recalled, he had rejected the idea of marriage as "quite inconceivable". He had a close friendship with "Baron Corvo," the alias of the novelist Frederick Rolfe, with whom he had hoped to write a book on St Thomas Becket, until Benson decided that he should not be associated (according to writer Brian Masters) "with a Venetian pimp and procurer of boys". Nevertheless, he maintained his friendship with Lord Alfred Douglas, the friend and lover of Oscar Wilde, and when an acquaintance protested that the connection with Douglas was inappropriate for him, he replied: "Lord Alfred Douglas is my friend, and he'll come down when he likes!"

Like many of his conservative and right-wing contemporaries, Robert Hugh Benson opposed the writings of Charles Darwin, Karl Marx, Friedrich Nietzsche, Sigmund Freud and similar 19th century writers.

Robert Hugh Benson was intolerant of most liberal and left-wing political and economic movements of his day. He regarded them as part of a Communist, Freemason and Jewish cabal.

In spite of Robert Hugh Benson's hatred of republicanism, he had a mostly positive view of the United States due to its political conservatism and deeply religious population. He sympathized more with the USA than most Catholics of his time, because he regarded Europe and Latin America as secular, liberal/left-wing, casual and modern.

Death and legacy
Benson died of pneumonia in 1914 in Salford, where he had been preaching a mission; he was 42. As he had requested, he was buried in the orchard of Hare Street House, his house in the Hertfordshire village of Hare Street. A chapel, dedicated to St Hugh, was built over the site. Benson bequeathed the house to the Catholic Church as a country retreat for the Archbishop of Westminster. The Catholic church in the nearby town of Buntingford, which he helped finance, is dedicated to St Richard of Chichester, but also known as the Benson Memorial Church.

In 2019, the house was put up for sale. Benson's body was exhumed and moved to the crypt of St Edmund's College in Old Hall Green.

The Benson Club is a Catholic reading group named in his honour at Fisher House, Cambridge.

Gallery

Works

Science fiction
 A Mirror of Shalott, Benziger Brothers, 1907.
 Lord of the World, Dodd, Mead & Company, 1908 [1st Pub. 1907].
 The Dawn of All, B. Herder, 1911.

Historical fiction
 By What Authority?, Isbister, 1904.
 Come Rack! Come Rope!, Dodd, Mead & Co., 1913 [1st Pub. 1912].
 Oddsfish!, Dodd, Mead & Co., 1914.
 The King's Achievement, Burns Oates & Washbourne, Lrd., 1905.
 The Queen's Tragedy, Sir Isaac Pitman & Sons Ltd., 1907.
 The History of Richard Raynal, Solitary, Sir Isaac Pitman & Sons Ltd., 1912.
 Initiation, Dodd, Mead & Co., 1914.

Contemporary fiction
 The Light Invisible, Sir Isaac Pitman and Sons Ltd., 1906.
 The Sentimentalists, Sir Isaac Pitman and Sons Ltd., 1906.
 The Conventionalists, Hutchinson & Co., 1908.
 The Necromancers, Hutchinson & Co., 1909.
 A Winnowing, B. Herder, 1910.
 None other gods, B. Herder, 1911.
 The Coward, B. Herder, 1912.
 An Average Man, Dodd, Mead & Company, 1913.
 Loneliness?, Dodd, Mead & Co., 1915.

Children's books
 Alphabet of Saints, with Reginald Balfour and Charles Ritchie, illustraded by L. D. Symington, Oates & Washbourne, 1905.
A Child's Rule of Life, illustrated by Gabriel Pippet, digitized by Richard Mammana.
Old Testament Rhymes, illustrated by Gabriel Pippet.

Devotional works
 Vexilla Regis: A Book of Devotions and Intercessions, Longmans, Green & Co., 1915 [1st Pub. 1914].
 A Book of the Love of Jesus: A Collection of Ancient English Devotions in Prose and Verse, Isaac Pitman & Sons, 1915.
 The Friendship of Christ, Longmans, Green & Co., 1914 [1st Pub. 1912].

Apologetic works
 The Religion of the Plain Man, Burns & Oates, 1906.
 Papers of a Pariah, Longmans, Green & Co., 1907.
 Non-Catholic Denominations, Longmans, Green & Co., 1910.
 Christ in the Church: A Volume of Religious Essays, Longmans, Green & Co., 1911.
 Confessions of a Convert, Longmans, Green & Co., 1913.
 Paradoxes of Catholicism, Longmans, Green & Co., 1913.
 Lourdes, The Manresa Press, 1914.
 Spiritual Letters of Monsignor R. Hugh Benson: to One of his Converts, Longmans, Green & Co., 1915.
 A Book of Essays, Catholic Truth Society, 1916.
 Sermon Notes, First Series: Anglican, Second Series: Catholic, Longmans, Green & Co., 1917.

Plays
 The Cost of a Crown, a Story of Douay & Durham; a Sacred Drama in Three Acts, Longmans, Green & Co., 1910.
 A Mystery Play in Honour of the Nativity of Our Lord, Longmans, Green, and Co., 1908.
 The Maid of Orleans, a Drama of the Life of Joan of Arc, Longmans, Green & Co., 1911.
 The Upper Room, a Drama of Christ's Passion, Longmans, Green & Co., 1914.

Selected articles
 "The Conversion of England," The American Ecclesiastical Review, Vol. XXXIV, 1906.
 "The State of Religion in England," The Catholic World, Vol. LXXXIV, October 1906/March 1907.
 "A Modern Theory of Human Personality," The Dublin Review, Vol. CXLI, 1907.
 "The Dissolution of the Religious Houses." In: Renascence and Reformation (From The Cambridge History of English Literature, 15 Vols.), 1908.
 "Letters of Queen Victoria, 1837-1861," The Dublin Review, Vol. CXLII, January/April 1908.
 "Christian Science," The Dublin Review, Vol. CXLIII, No. 286, October 1908.
 "Spiritualism," The Dublin Review, Vol. CXLV, No. 290-291, July/October, 1909.
 "A Catholic Colony," The Dublin Review, Vol. CXLVI, January/April, 1910.
 "Catholicism and the Future," The Atlantic Monthly, Vol. CVI, 1910.
 "Phantasms of the Dead," The Dublin Review, Vol. CL, No. 300-301, January/April, 1912.
 "Cosmopolitanism and Catholicism," The North American Review, September 1912.
 "Cardinal Gasquet," The Dublin Review, Vol. CLV, July/October, 1914.

Other
 The Holy Blissful Martyr Saint Thomas of Canterbury, Benziger Brothers, 1910.
 The Life of Saint Teresa, Herbert & Daniel, 1912. (Preface only (20 pages), author is Alice Lady Lovat)
 Poems, Burns & Oates, 1914.
 Maxims from the Writings of Mgr. Benson, By the compiler of "Thoughts from Augustine Birrell," R. & T. Washbourne Ltd., 1915.

See also

 G.K. Chesterton
 Gerard Manley Hopkins
 John Henry Newman
 List of dystopian literature

Bibliography
 Beesley, Thomas Quinn (1916). "The Poetry of Robert Hugh Benson," The Catholic Educational Review, Vol. XII, pp. 122–134.
 Benson, Arthur C. (1915). Hugh: Memoirs of a Brother. London: Smith, Elder & Co.
 Bleiler, Everett (1948). The Checklist of Fantastic Literature. Chicago: Shasta Publishers.
 Bour'his, Jean Morris le (1980). Robert Hugh Benson, Homme de Foi et Artiste. Atelier Reproduction de Thèses, Université de Lille III.
 Braybrooke, Patrick (1931). "Robert Hugh Benson; Novelist and Philosopher." In: Some Catholic Novelists. London: Burns, Oates & Washbourne.
 Brown, Stephen J.M. & Thomas McDermott (1945). A Survey of Catholic Literature. Milwaukee: The Bruce Publishing Company.
 Concannon, Helena (1914). "Robert Hugh Benson, Novelist," Part II, The Catholic World, Vol. XCIX, pp. 487–498, 635–645.
 Gorce, Agnès de La (1928). Robert Hugh Benson: Prêtre et Romancier, 1871-1914. Paris: Plon.
 Grayson, Janet (1998). Robert Hugh Benson: Life and Works. Lanham, Md.: University Press of America.
 Marshall, George. "Two Autobiographical Narratives of Conversion: Robert Hugh Benson and Ronald Knox." British Catholic History 24.2 (1998): 237–253. 
 Martindale, C.C. (1916). The Life of Monsignor Robert Hugh Benson, Vol. 2. London: Longmans, Green & Co.
 McMahon, Joseph H. (1915). "The Late Monsignor Robert Hugh Benson," Records of the American Catholic Historical Society of Philadelphia, Vol. XXVI, pp. 55–63.
 McMahon, Joseph H. (1915). "Robert Hugh Benson: A Personal Memory," The Bookman, Vol. XLI, pp. 160–169.
 Monaghan, Sister Mary Saint Rita (1985). Monsignor Robert Hugh Benson: His Apostolate and Its Message for Our Time. Brisbane, Qld.: Boolarong Publications.
 Parr, Olive Katherine (1915). Robert Hugh Benson: An Appreciation. London: Hutchinson & Co.
 Ross, Allan (1915). Monsignor Hugh Benson (1871-1914). The Catholic Truth Society.
 Shadurski, Maxim (2020). The Nationality of Utopia: H. G. Wells, England, and the World State. London; New York: Routledge. . (Chapter 3 features an in-depth discussion of The Dawn of All.)
 Shuster, Norman (1922). "Robert Hugh Benson and the Aging Novel." In: The Catholic Spirit in Modern English Literature. New York: The Macmillan Company, pp. 208–228.
 Warre Cornish, Blanche (1914). Memorials of Robert Hugh Benson. New York: P.J. Kenedy & Sons.
 Watt, Reginald J.J. (1918). Robert Hugh Benson: Captain in God's Army. London: Burns & Oates Ltd.

References

External links

Online editions
 
 
 

1871 births
1914 deaths
19th-century English Anglican priests
19th-century English Roman Catholic priests
20th-century English novelists
20th-century English Roman Catholic priests
Anti-Masonry
People educated at Eton College
Alumni of Trinity College, Cambridge
Anglican priest converts to Roman Catholicism
Robert
British monarchists
Conservatism in the United Kingdom
Counter-Enlightenment
Christian humanists
English Anglo-Catholics
English science fiction writers
English religious writers
English children's writers
English historical novelists
Writers of historical fiction set in the early modern period
English dramatists and playwrights
English horror writers
English male dramatists and playwrights
English male novelists
Ghost story writers
Integralism
Jacobitism
People of the Victorian era
Knights Commander of the Order of St Gregory the Great
Knights of the Holy Sepulchre
Members of Anglican religious orders
Right-wing politics in the United Kingdom
Roman Catholic writers
Romanticism
Toryism
Virtue ethicists
Deaths from pneumonia in England
Christian novelists